"Spit Your Game" is the second single by Notorious B.I.G. from his Duets: The Final Chapter album, a remixed album of Biggie Smalls' work. The song features guest appearances from Bone Thugs-N-Harmony's Krayzie Bone and Twista and sampled The Walker Brothers' "My Ship Is Coming In" from their Take It Easy with the Walker Brothers album. The single is a double A-side with "Hold Ya Head", a song which samples "Johnny Was" from Bob Marley's Rastaman Vibration album by his reggae band The Wailers and "Suicidal Thoughts" from Biggie's Ready to Die for his vocals.

The single was released on 24 April in the UK and reached No. 64 on the UK chart.

It is a modern rendition of Notorious B.I.G.'s and Bone Thugs-N-Harmony's acclaimed collaboration on the song "Notorious Thugs". In "Notorious Thugs" Biggie changed his normally smooth flow to a faster melodic pace to emulate Bone's trademark flow and "Spit Your Game" references this by including two fast verses by Twista and Krayzie Bone.

Video
The video for "Spit Your Game" features Layzie Bone, Wish Bone, Krayzie Bone, Twista, Eightball & MJG and Swizz Beatz. It is set in a recording studio as a "Battle for the Krown" is taking place.

On the airing of MTV's Making the Video episode for "Spit Your Game", it was announced that this will be the last video ever to be in dedication of The Notorious B.I.G. Yung Joc, Jody Breeze, Big Gee, Layzie Bone, Wish Bone, Swizz Beatz & Sleepy Brown made an appearance on the video, the video was directed by Dr.Teeth

Remixes
"Spit Your Game" is a remix of "Notorious Thugs", a Notorious B.I.G. and Bone Thugs-N-Harmony duet on Biggie's second, diamond album Life After Death.

The song also features a remixed version, where 8Ball & MJG spit a verse each towards the end of the song, though their verses have been much criticized for not keeping in context with fast rapping and doing basic slow verses. This remix will be on the compilation We Invented the Remix Vol. 2.

Track listing

UK - CD: 1
 Spit Your Game [Remix Edit] (Featuring Twista, Eightball & MJG & Krayzie Bone)
 Hold Ya Head [Main Version] (Featuring Bob Marley)

UK - CD: 2
 Spit Your Game [Remix] (Featuring Twista, Eightball & MJG & Bone Thugs-N-Harmony)
 Hold Ya Head [Main Version] (Featuring Bob Marley)
 Spit Your Game [MyTone - Personalized Ringtone]

UK - 12" vinyl
 Spit Your Game [Remix] (Featuring Twista, Eightball & MJG & Bone Thugs-N-Harmony) 
 Spit Your Game [Instrumental Remix] 
 Hold Ya Head [Main Version] (Featuring Bob Marley)
 Hold Ya Head [Instrumental]

Promo CD
 Spit Your Game [Remix Edit] (Featuring Twista, Eightball & MJG & Bone Thugs-N-Harmony) 
 Spit Your Game [Remix Instrumental] 
 Hold Ya Head [Amended Album Version] (Featuring Bob Marley)
 Hold Ya Head [Instrumental]

Charts

References

External links

2006 singles
The Notorious B.I.G. songs
Songs released posthumously
Twista songs
Bad Boy Records singles
Song recordings produced by Swizz Beatz
Songs written by Sean Combs
Songs written by Twista
Songs written by the Notorious B.I.G.
2005 songs
Atlantic Records singles